Burdale may refer to:-

Burdale, North Yorkshire
Burdale railway station
Burdale Tunnel
, a cargo ship